Corban Baxter (née McGregor; born 10 April 1994) is an Australian international rugby league footballer who plays as a ,  or  for the Cronulla-Sutherland Sharks in the NSWRL Women's Premiership. 

She last played for the Sydney Roosters in the NRL Women's Premiership and is an Australia and New South Wales representative.

Background & Personal Life
Baxter was born in Auckland, New Zealand, and has Māori ancestry. She moved to Australia with her family at the age of 3. Baxter has a son, who was born when she was aged 16, and has announced she is expecting another child in January 2023.

Playing career
In 2015, Baxter began playing rugby league for the Helensburgh Tigers. That year, she made her debut for New South Wales in a 4-all draw with Queensland.

In June 2018, she represented NSW City at the Women's National Championships. On 17 June 2018, she signed for the Sydney Roosters NRL Women's Premiership team. On 22 June 2018, during the inaugural Women's State of Origin, Baxter suffered a shoulder injury, ruling her out of the entire 2018 NRL Women's season.

In Round 1 of the 2019 NRL Women's season, Baxter made her debut for the Roosters in their 12–16 loss to the New Zealand Warriors. In October 2019, she represented Australia at the 2019 Rugby League World Cup 9s, where they lost to New Zealand in the finals.

On 22 February 2020, she represented the Māori All Stars in their 4–10 loss to the Indigenous All Stars.

On 20 February 2021, she captained the Māori All Stars in their 24–0 win over the Indigenous All Stars.

On 27 June 2022, Corban Baxter announced that due to pregnancy, she had missed the 2022 State of Origin match, and would miss the 2022 NRL Women's season (held from August to early October) and the World Cup (in November 2022).

References

External links
Sydney Roosters profile

1994 births
Living people
New Zealand Māori rugby league players
Australian female rugby league players
Australia women's national rugby league team players
Rugby league fullbacks
Rugby league centres
Rugby league five-eighths
Sydney Roosters (NRLW) players